General Lang may refer to:

Derek Lang (1913−2001), British Army lieutenant general
Frank C. Lang (1918–2008), U.S. Marine Corps major general
Joachim-Friedrich Lang (1899–1945), German Heer major general
Ross Lang (fl. 1760s–1780s), Madras Army lieutenant general
Vaughn O. Lang (1927–2014), U.S. Army lieutenant general

See also
Henrik Lange (1908–2000), Swedish Coastal Artillery lieutenant general
Wolfgang Lange (general) (1898–1988), German Wehrmacht lieutenant general
General Long (disambiguation)